Kusahlar (also Romanized as Kūsahlar and Kūsehlar; also known as Kossehlar, Kusahiar, Kusalar, and Kūzehlar) is a village in Ijrud-e Bala Rural District, in the Central District of Ijrud County, Zanjan Province, Iran. At the 2006 census, its population was 634, in 126 families.

References 

Populated places in Ijrud County